{{Infobox song contest national year 
| Contest                = Junior
| Year                   = 2014
| Country                = Netherlands
| Preselection           = Junior Songfestival 201433% Jury33% Kids Jury33% Televoting| Preselection date      = Semi-finals:13 September 201420 September 2014Final:27 September 2014
| Entrant                = Julia
| Song                   = Around
| Final result           = 8th, 70 points
}}

The Netherlands selected their Junior Eurovision Song Contest 2014 entry through Junior Songfestival'', a national selection consisting of eight songs. The competing songs were broken down into two semi-finals taking place on 13 and 20 September 2014. The winner was announced to be Julia van Bergen (credited as Julia) with her song "Around" on 27 September 2014. The expert jury consisted of Xander de Buisonjé, Niels Geusebroek, and Yvonne Coldeweijer.

Before Junior Eurovision

Junior Songfestival 2014 
From each semi-final two entries qualified for the final based on the decision of adult and kids juries as well as televoting. The fifth entry in the final was chosen by online voting (web wildcard).

Competing entries 

Table key
 Participants who qualified to the final via jury and televoting.
 Participants who qualified to the final via wildcard

Semi-final 1

Semi-final 2

Final

At Junior Eurovision 
At the running order draw which took place on 9 November 2014, the Netherlands were drawn to perform last on 15 November 2014, following host country . The Netherlands finished 8th in the final with 70 points. The Netherlands placed 6th in the televoting with 69 points, while the jury vote placed the Netherlands 9th with 44 points.

Voting

Detailed voting results
The following members comprised the Dutch jury:
 Rachel Traets
 Kirsten Schneider
 Guido van Gend
 Monique Smit
 Tim Douwsma

Julia van Bergen
Julia van Bergen  (born 17 September 1999 in Harderwijk), also known as Julia, is a Dutch singer. She represented The Netherlands in the Junior Eurovision Song Contest 2014 in Malta with the song "Around". Since then, singles have included "Round And Around" (2015), "Baby Come Home" (2015) and "The One" (2016). In 2017/2018, Julia was a contestant on The voice of Holland, reaching the Knock Out phase.

Notes

References

Junior Eurovision Song Contest
Netherlands
2014